Hailey is a city in and the county seat of Blaine County, in the Wood River Valley of the central part of the U.S. state of Idaho. The population was 7,960 at the 2010 census, up from 6,200 in 2000. The town of Bellevue is a few miles south. From 1882 to 1895, Hailey was the county seat of now-defunct Alturas County.

The city is named after John Hailey, a two-time Congressional delegate from the Idaho Territory.

Demographics

2010 census
As of the census of 2010, there were 7,960 people, 3,065 households, and 2,053 families residing in the city. The racial makeup of the city was 80.2% White, 0.2% African American, 0.7% Native American, 0.8% Asian, 0.1% Pacific Islander, 16.2% from other races, and 1.9% from two or more races. Hispanic or Latino of any race were 28.1% of the population.

There were 3,065 households, of which 41.0% had children under the age of 18 living with them, 51.1% were married couples living together, 11.0% had a female householder with no husband present, 5.0% had a male householder with no wife present, and 33.0% were non-families. Of all households 25.8% were made up of individuals, and 6% had someone living alone who was 65 years of age or older. The average household size was 2.58 and the average family size was 3.15.

The median age in the city was 35.1 years. 28.6% of residents were under the age of 18; 6.7% were between the ages of 18 and 24; 29.8% were from 25 to 44; 28.3% were from 45 to 64; and 6.5% were 65 years of age or older. The gender makeup of the city was 50.0% male and 50.0% female.

2000 census
As of the census of 2000, there were 6,200 people, 2,389 households, and 1,603 families residing in the city. The racial makeup of the city was 89.68% White, 0.26% African American, 0.35% Native American, 1.08% Asian, 0.05% Pacific Islander, 7.02% from other races, and 1.56% from two or more races. Hispanic or Latino of any race were 11.95% of the population.

There were 2,389 households, out of which 42.6% had children under the age of 18 living with them, 51.5% were married couples living together, 10.2% had a female householder with no husband present, and 32.9% were non-families. 23.7% of all households were made up of individuals, and 5.2% had someone living alone who was 65 years of age or older.  The average household size was 2.56 and the average family size was 3.09.

In the city, the population was spread out, with 29.7% under the age of 18, 6.7% from 18 to 24, 37.4% from 25 to 44, 20.9% from 45 to 64, and 5.3% who were 65 years of age or older.  The median age was 33 years. For every 100 females, there were 99.6 males.  For every 100 females age 18 and over, there were 96.9 males.

The median income for a household in the city was $51,347, and the median income for a family was $56,379. Males had a median income of $37,750 versus $29,025 for females. The per capita income for the city was $21,255.  About 4.6% of families and 6.1% of the population were below the poverty line, including 7.3% of those under age 18 and 4.2% of those age 65 or over.

Geography

Hailey has a continental Mediterranean climate (Köppen Dsb). Winters are cold and snowy: there are an average of forty-four days each year which fail to top , whilst 199 nights fall below freezing and nineteen nights between November and March will fall to or below . Spring warms up slowly, with snow falling as late as May. Summer is hot during the day, but cools off into the 40s or 50s at night. Freezing nights can happen any time of the year, even in July and August. There is little rain, coming only as isolated showers or storms a few times per month. Most days are sunny and this is the driest part of the year. Fall starts warm in September and then quickly cools off. Snow has fallen in September, but usually holds off until October. Early fall is dry and sunny like summer. Days in the 70s can happen well into October, but  has been recorded in November. Precipitation falls primarily as snow in winter and as thunderstorms in late spring. The rest of the year is mostly dry.

Education
The Blaine County School System, located in Hailey, provides several schools for local children.  Hailey Elementary is located in the center of Hailey, and the new Alturas Elementary is located in the south of the city.  Wood River Middle School lies north of downtown, and Wood River High School sits near the Foxmoor subdivision.

The Silver Creek Alternative School provides a different avenue for students who have struggled in a typical school setting.

The College of Southern Idaho's Blaine Country Center is located in Hailey.

Private education options in the area include the Sage School in Hailey for 6th through 12th grade students and the Community School in neighboring Sun Valley for elementary through high school students.

Outdoor life

Hailey is surrounded by the Sawtooth National Forest. Activities such as hiking, biking, skiing, snowboarding, BMX riding, skateboarding, horseback riding, ice skating and fly fishing are popular in Hailey. Hailey was home to the Sun Valley Polo Club until 1999.

West of town, Hailey has its own ski hill called Rotarun Ski Area, which is much smaller than its local cousin at the Sun Valley Resort.

Other mountains in Hailey are Carbonate, Red Devil Peak (6594 ft.), and Della (6729 ft.).  These mountains are popular for hiking, mountain biking, dog walking and other outdoor activities.

Friedman Memorial Airport
The Friedman Memorial Airport provides direct flights to Salt Lake City, and Seattle most year round.  Direct flights to Los Angeles, Denver, San Francisco and Chicago are available seasonally.  The airport has a private terminal for small jets.  Herbert Allen Jr.'s annual summer executive retreat, Allen & Company Sun Valley Conference is a regular client of Friedman Memorial Airport. Idaho Highway 75 runs past the airport.

Friedman Memorial Airport is named for Simon Moses Friedman, a Jewish merchant and sheep rancher who settled in Hailey in the 1880s and was elected its first mayor when the city was incorporated in 1909. His children Leon and Lucile Friedman donated the land for the airport to the city in 1931.

Publications and media

Hailey is the home to Sun Valley Magazine, a quarterly publication focusing on fine dining, real estate and local events.  Hailey has two local newspapers:  The Idaho Mountain Express and The Weekly Sun.  The Idaho Mountain Express is located in Ketchum and is published every Wednesday and Friday. The Weekly Sun is located in Hailey and is published every Wednesday.

Snowboard Magazine was founded in Hailey, Idaho in the year 2004 by local resident Mark Sullivan. The magazine quickly grew to the 3rd largest snowboarding publication in the world before being sold to Storm Mountain Publishing in 2007.

KECH at 95.3 FM is a local radio station. Another is KSKI-FM at 94.5 FM.

Plum TV premiered in 2007 from Hailey, Idaho. Plum TV is a boutique network at upscale resort communities.

Independence Day
Every year, the town of Hailey, Idaho celebrates Independence Day as Days of the Old West.  The celebration consists of four major events.  Main Street is cleared and the sidewalks fill with spectators.  At noon, a mock old west shoot out takes place in the centre of town.  The next event is a parade. After the parade, spectators gather at Hop Porter Park for food and music. Activities also include a rodeo and fireworks.

Notable people
In 1988, Bruce Willis and his then wife Demi Moore moved to Hailey and spent millions revitalizing the downtown and buying up land. The actor renovated buildings, opened a diner, bought a dive bar and a movie theater on the main street, and arranged for a Virginian theater group to relocate to the town. He initially did so anonymously, purchasing the establishments and vacant lots under the name of his company, Ix Nay Investment Trust. Local journalists eventually blew his cover, much to Willis' dismay. His establishments would go on to employ a significant percentage of the small town's active population. In May 1998, he abruptly closed Shorty's (the diner) and the Mint (the dive bar), putting many Hailey residents out of work. Additionally, he withdrew most investments from the town, leaving many outstanding projects unrealized. In 2018, he sold his 20-acre ranch in Hailey for $5.5 million.

Other notable residents include:
 Bowe Bergdahl, United States Army held captive by the Taliban in Afghanistan 
 Tara Buck, actress
 Shane Carden, Football Player
 Dorothy Custer, TV host, harmonicist, centenarian
 Laverne Fator, U.S. Racing Hall of Fame jockey
 Simon J. Friedman, businessman and Jewish community leader
 Simon M. Friedman, businessman and politician
 Chase Josey, snowboarder
 Pamela Sue Martin, actress
 Debbie McDonald, dressage Olympian
 Bob Mizer, photographer
 Ezra Pound, poet
 E. Parry Thomas, banker
 Leopold Werthheimer, businessman and philanthropist
 Mats Wilander, tennis player
 Rumer Willis, actress, Dancing with the Stars winner

References

External links

 
 Chamber of Commerce—Hailey, Idaho

 
Cities in Blaine County, Idaho
Cities in Idaho
County seats in Idaho